Luigi Castelletti (born 6 July 1948) is an Italian racing cyclist. He rode in the 1972 Tour de France.

References

External links
 

1948 births
Living people
Italian male cyclists
Place of birth missing (living people)
Sportspeople from Verona
Cyclists from the Province of Verona